John Luther Adams (born January 23, 1953) is an American composer whose music is inspired by nature, especially the landscapes of Alaska, where he lived from 1978 to 2014. His orchestral work Become Ocean was awarded the 2014 Pulitzer Prize for Music.

Early life
Born in Meridian, Mississippi, Adams began playing music as a teenager as a drummer in rock bands. He attended the California Institute of the Arts as an undergraduate in the early 1970s, studying with James Tenney and Leonard Stein, and graduated in 1973. After graduating, Adams began work in environmental protection, and through this work Adams first travelled to Alaska in 1975. Adams moved to Alaska in 1978 and lived there until 2014. He now splits his time between New York and the Sonoran desert in Mexico, though his time in Alaska continues to be a prominent influence in his music. From 1982 to 1989, he performed as timpanist and principal percussionist with the Fairbanks Symphony Orchestra and the Arctic Chamber Orchestra.

Career
Adams's composition work spans many genres and media. He has composed for television, film, children's theater, voice, acoustic instruments, orchestra, and electronics. Early in his career, Adams was influenced by the music and writings of Frank Zappa, whose enthusiasm for Edgard Varèse intrigued Adams.  Through his careful listening to Varèse, Adams developed an interest in and was influenced by the music of John Cage,and Karlheinz Stockhausen, among others.   From 1998 to 2002, Adams served as Associate Professor of Composition at Oberlin Conservatory of Music.

Influence of nature
Adams has described his music as, "[...] profoundly influenced by the natural world and a strong sense of place. Through sustained listening to the subtle resonances of the northern soundscape, I hope to explore the territory of sonic geography—that region between place and culture...between environment and imagination".

His love of nature, concern for the environment and interest in the resonance of specific places led him to pursue the concept of sonic geography. Early examples of this idea include two works written during Adams's sojourn in rural Georgia: Songbirdsongs (1974–80), a collection of indeterminate miniature pieces for piccolos and percussion based on free translations of bird songs, and Night Peace (1977), a vocal work capturing the nocturnal soundscape of the Okefenokee Swamp through slow-changing and sparse sonic textures.

His work, Sila: The Breath of the World, represents the "air element", following the representation of water in Become Ocean and the "earth element" in Inuksuit, an outdoor percussion piece. His music, he says, is "our awareness of the world in which we live and the world's awareness of us".

His more recent works include, Across the Distance, for a large number of horns, was premiered on the 5th of July, 2015 at the Cambo estate in Fife, Scotland as part of the East Neuk Festival. His recording of Ilimaq ("spirit journeys"), a solo work for percussion, played by art-music percussionist, composer, and Wilco drummer Glenn Kotche, was released in October 2015. A combination of contemporary classical music, Alaskan field recordings, and found sounds from the natural world, it evokes the travels of a shaman riding the sound of a drum to and from the spirit world.

Awards and honors
In 2014 Adams won the Pulitzer Prize for Music for his orchestral piece Become Ocean, which Alex Ross of The New Yorker called "the loveliest apocalypse in musical history". It was premiered in 2013 by Ludovic Morlot and the Seattle Symphony and performed by the same conductor and orchestra at the 2014 Spring For Music music festival at Carnegie Hall. Adams had never been to Carnegie Hall before hearing his work played there to a sold-out house. The surround-sound recording of Become Ocean on Cantaloupe Music debuted at No. 1 on the Billboard Traditional Classical Chart, stayed there for two straight weeks, and went on to win the Grammy Award for Best Contemporary Classical Composition.

In October 2015, Adams received the William Schuman Award from Columbia University. The events surrounding the award included a series of concerts of his music at the Miller Theater, including Clouds of Forgetting, Clouds of Unknowing, For Lou Harrison, and In the White Silence.

 On February 8, 2015, Adams was awarded a GRAMMY in the category Best Contemporary Classical Composition for his Become Ocean.
 In November 2014, Adams was named the Musical America 2015 Composer of the Year.
 Adams was the recipient of the 2010 Nemmers Prize in Music Composition. He was cited by the selection committee for melding the physical and musical worlds into a unique artistic vision that transcends stylistic boundaries.
 The Callithumpian Consort's recording of Adams' Four Thousand Holes was noted as one of The New Yorker'''s Best Classical Recordings of 2011.
 In 2012, he received the 17th Annual Heinz Award with a special focus on the environment.
 In 2006, Adams was named one of the first United States Artists Fellows. He has received awards and fellowships from the National Endowment for the Arts, the Rockefeller Foundation, the Rasmuson Foundation, and the Foundation for Contemporary Arts.
 Adams received a 1993 Foundation for Contemporary Arts Grants to Artists Award.

List of worksGreen Corn Dance (1974) for percussion ensembleNight Peace (1976) for antiphonal choirs, solo soprano, harp, and percussionsongbirdsongs (1974–80) for 2 piccolos and 3 percussionStrange Birds Passing (1983) for flute choirup into the silence (1978/84) (poem by E. E. Cummings) for voice and pianoHow the Sun Came to the Forest (1984) (poem by John Haines) for chorus and alto flute, English horn, percussion, harp, and stringsThe Far Country of Sleep (1988) for orchestraGiving Birth to Thunder, Sleeping With His Daughter, Coyote Builds North America (1986–90) for theatermagic song for one who wishes to live and the dead who climb up to the sky (1990) for voice and pianoDream in White-on-White (1992) for orchestraEarth and the Great Weather (1990–93) for theater, libretto published in the book "Inukshuk" edited by ARBOS – Company for Music & Theater, Vienna 1999, Five Yup'ik Dances (1991–94) for solo harpCrow and Weasel (1993–94) (story by Barry Lopez) for theaterSauyatugvik: the Time of Drumming (1995) for orchestraClouds of Forgetting, Clouds of Unknowing (1991–95) for orchestraSauyatugvik: The Time of Drumming (1996) version for 2 pianos, timpani, and 4 percussionFive Athabascan Dances (1992/96) for harp and percussionStrange and Sacred Noise (1991–97) for percussion quartetMake Prayers to the Raven (1996/98) flute, violin, harp, cello, and percussionIn the White Silence (1998) for orchestraQilyaun (1998) for four bass drumsTime Undisturbed (1999) for 3 shakuhachis, 3 kotos, and shōIn a Treeless Place, Only Snow (1999) for celesta, harp, 2 vibraphones, and string quartetThe Light That Fills the World (1999–2000) for orchestraAmong Red Mountains (2001) for solo pianoThe Immeasurable Space of Tones (1998–2001) for violin, vibraphone, piano, sustaining keyboard, contrabass instrumentThe Farthest Place (2001) for violin, vibraphone, marimba, piano, double bassAfter the Light (2001) for alto flute, vibraphone, harpDark Wind (2001) for bass clarinet, vibraphone, marimba, pianoRed Arc/Blue Veil (2002) for piano, mallet percussion, and processed soundsThe Mathematics of Resonant Bodies (2002) for solo percussion and processed soundsPoem of the Forgotten (2004) (poem by John Haines) for voice and pianofor Lou Harrison (2004, premiere 2005) for string quartet, string orchestra, and 2 pianos...and bells remembered... (2005) for bowed crotales, orchestra bells, chimes, vibraphone and bowed vibraphonefor Jim (rising) (2006) for three trumpets and three trombonesAlways Very Soft (2007) for percussion trioDark Waves (2007) for orchestra and electronic soundsLittle Cosmic Dust Poem (2007) for voice (medium) and pianoNunataks (Solitary Peaks) (2007) for solo pianoThree High Places (2007) for solo violinThe Light Within (2007) for alto flute, bass clarinet, vibraphone/crotales, piano, violin, cello and electronic soundsSky with Four Suns and Sky with Four Moons (2008) for four choirsthe place we began (2008) four electro-acoustic soundscapesInuksuit (2009) for nine to ninety-nine percussionFour Thousand Holes (2010) for piano, percussion, and electronic soundsThe Wind in High Places (2011) for string quartetI L I M A Q (2012), a drum-kit opera, premiered at the University of Texas at Austin, performed by Glenn KotcheBecome Ocean (2013) for orchestra, premiered at the Seattle Symphony, June 20, 2013, conducted by Ludovic MorlotBecome River (2013) for chamber orchestra, premiered by the Saint Paul Chamber Orchestra, April 3, 2014, conducted by Steven SchickTen Thousand Birds (2014) for chamber orchestra, premiered by Alarm Will Sound, October 19, 2014Sila: The Breath of the World (2014) for choir, percussion, strings, brass, and woodwinds premiered at the Mostly Mozart Festival at Lincoln Center, July 25, 2014, led by Doug PerkinsAcross the Distance (2015) for horns in multiples of 8, premiered at the East Neuk Festival at the Cambo estate, July 5, 2015, led by Alec Frank-Gemmilluntouched (2015) for string quartet, commissioned by the University of North Carolina for Brooklyn RiderCanticles of the Holy Wind (2013) for four choirs (SATB) and solo voices, with percussion, commissioned by The Crossing and others, premiered at the Metropolitan Museum of Art, October 29, 2016Everything That Rises (2017) for string quartet, commissioned by SF JazzThe Wind Garden (2017), a permanent public artwork commissioned by the Stuart Collection at the University of California San DiegoBecome Desert (2018), a work for five ensembles, premiered at the Seattle Symphony's Benaroya Hall, 29 March 2018, conducted by Ludovic MorlotLines Made by Walking (2019), string quartet, commissioned by the Tippet Rise Art CenterArctic Dreams (2020) for 2 sopranos, 1 alto, and 1 bass voice, violin, viola, cello, and double bass, commissioned by Synergy VocalsAn Atlas of Deep Time (2022) for orchestra, Premiered by the South Dakota Symphony Orchestra for their Centennial Finale, April 30, 2022, conducted by Delta David Gier

Discographysongbirdsongs (1981), Anne McFarland, Kevin Culver, Michel Cook (ocarina), John Luther Adams, Kevin Culver, Scott Douglas, Tim Embry (perc.), Anne McFarland, Michel Cook (picc, fl), LP, Opus One, Number 66A Northern Suite/Night Peace (1983), The Arctic Chamber Orchestra, Gordon Wright (cond.), The Atlanta Singers, Cheryl Bray (sop.), Joan Rubin (harp), Billy Traylor (perc.), Kevin Culver (cond.), LP, Opus One, Number 88Forest Without Leaves (1987), Arctic Chamber Orchestra, various vocal soloists, Byron McGilvray (cond.), LP, Owl Recording, OWL-32The Far Country (1993), CD, New Albion, NA 061 Dream in White on White The Apollo Quartet and Strings, JoAnn Falletta (cond.)Night Peace The Atlanta Singers, Cheryl Bray Lower (sop.), Nella Rigel (harp), Michael Cebulski (perc.), Kevin Culver (cond.)The Far Country of Sleep The Cabrillo Festival Orchestra, JoAnn Falletta (cond.)Earth and the Great Weather (1995), Michael Finkel (vcl), Robert Black (cb), Amy Knoles, John Luther Adams, Robert Black, Robin Lorentz (perc.), Robin Lorentz (vln), Ron Lawrence (vla), John Luther Adams, Michael Finkel (cond.), CD, New World Records, 80459-2Clouds of Forgetting, Clouds of Unknowing (1997), The Apollo Chamber Orchestra, JoAnn Falletta (cond.), CD, New World Records, 80500-2 – nominated for the 1999 Grammy Award in the Best Classical Contemporary Composition and Best Orchestral Performance categoriesDark Wind (2002), Marty Walker (bass cl), Amy Knoles (vibraphone, marimba), Bryan Pezzone (piano), CD, Cold Blue Music, CB0009The Light That Fills the World (2002), Marty Walker (bass cl), Barry Newton (double bass), Nathaniel Reichman (keyboards, sound design), Bryan Pezzone (piano), Amy Knoles (vibraphone, marimba), Robin Lorentz (violin), CD, Cold Blue Music, CB0010The Farthest PlaceThe Light That Fills the WorldThe Immeasurable Space of TonesIn the White Silence (2003), The Oberlin Contemporary Music Ensemble, Tim Weiss (cond.), CD, New World Records, 80600-2Strange and Sacred Noise (2005), Percussion Group Cincinnati, CD and DVD, Mode Records, mode 153The Mathematics of Resonant Bodies (2006), Steven Schick (perc.), CD, Cantaloupe Music, CA21034for Lou Harrison (2007), Callithumpian Consort, Stephen Drury (cond.), CD, New World Records, 80669-2red arc/blue veil (2007), CD, Cold Blue Music, CB0026Dark Waves Stephen Drury, Yukiko Takagi (piano)Among Red Mountains Stephen Drury (piano)Qilyuan Scott Deal, Stuart Gerber (bass drum)red arc/blue veil Stephen Drury (piano), Scott Deal (Vibraphone, Crotales)The Place We Began (2009), CD, Cold Blue Music, CB0032 – appears on 2009's Best (Mostly) 'New Music', from WNYCFour Thousand Holes (2011), Callithumpian Consort, Scott Deal (perc.), Stephen Drury (cond.), CD, Cold Blue Music, CB0035Four Thousand Holes. . . and bells remembered . . .songbirdsongs (2012), CD, Mode Records, mode 240songbirdsongs Callithumpian Consort, Stephen Drury (cond.)Strange Birds Passing New England Conservatory Contemporary Music Ensemble, John Heiss (cond.)Inuksuit (2013), So Percussion Ensemble, Doug Perkins (cond.). CD and DVD recording. Cantaloupe Music [no catalog number].Become Ocean (2014), Seattle Symphony; Ludovic Morlot, conductor, Cantaloupe Music CA 21101The Wind In High Places (2015), JACK Quartet, Northwestern University Cello Ensemble, Cold Blue Music, CB0041Ilimaq (2015), Glenn Kotche, Cantaloupe Music Everything That Rises (2017), JACK Quartet (CD, Cold Blue Music CB0051, February 2018)Become Desert (2019), Seattle Symphony; Ludovic Morlot, conductor, Cantaloupe Music CA 21148The Become Trilogy  (2020), Seattle Symphony; Ludovic Morlot, conductor, Cantaloupe Music  - contains Become Ocean, Become Desert (remastered) and Become River (previously unreleased).Lines Made by Walking (2020), album also includes untouched, JACK Quartet, Cold Blue Music CB0058Houses of the Wind (2022), (CD Cold Blue Music CB0063, June 2022)

WritingsThe Place Where You Go To Listen – In Search of an Ecology of Music (Wesleyan University Press, 2009)
"The Immeasurable Space of Tones," Musicworks 91 (Spring, 2005)
"Sonic Geography Alaska," Musicworks 93 (Fall, 2005)
"Winter Music: Composing the North", (Wesleyan University Press, 2004)
"Global Warming and Art", Orion (September–October, 2003)
"Global Warming and Art", Musicworks 86 (Summer, 2003)
"Winter Music. A Composer's Journal", In The Best Spiritual Writing 2002, edited by Philip Zaleski (Harper Collins, 2002), pp. 1–21.
"Winter Music. A Composer's Journal", Musicworks 82 (February, 2002)
"The Place Where You Go to Listen", In The Book of Music and Nature, edited by David Rothenberg and Marta Ulvaeus (Wesleyan University Press, 2000), pp. 181–182.
"Winter Music. A Composer's Journal", In Reflections on American Music, edited by James R. Heintze and Michael Saffle (Hillsdale, NY: Pendragon Press, 2000), pp. 31–48.
"Strange and Sacred Noise", Yearbook of Soundscape Studies (Vol. 1: "Northern Soundscapes," ed. R. Murray Schafer and Helmi Järviluoma, 1998), pp. 143–146.
"The Place Where You Go to Listen", Terra Nova, 2/3, 1997, pp. 15–16.
"From the Ground Up", The Utne Reader, March/April, 1995, p. 86.
"Resonance of Place, Confessions of an Out-of-Town Composer", The North American Review, January/February, 1994, pp. 8–18.

 References 

Sources

 
 
 
 

 

 
 
 
 
 
 
 
 
 
 

 
 

Further reading

 Adams, John Luther. 2004. Winter Music: Composing the North. Middletown, Connecticut: Wesleyan University Press. .
 Adams, John Luther. 2009. The Place Where You Go to Listen: In Search of an Ecology of Music. Middletown, Connecticut: Wesleyan University Press. .
 Alburger, Mark. 2000. "A to Z: Interviews with John Luther Adams". 21st-Century Music 7, no. 1 (January): 1–12.
 Cooper, Michael. 2015. "John Luther Adams Wins William Schuman Award" [alternate title: "John Luther Adams Wins a Lifetime Achievement Award"]. The New York Times 2015-01-08
 Feisst, Sabine. n.d. "Adams, John Luther." Grove Music Online. Oxford Music Online. Oxford University Press, accessed October 21, 2014. 
 Feisst, Sabine. 2001. "". MusikTexte: Zeitschrift für Neue Musik, no. 91 (November): 4–13.
 Gann, Kyle. 1997. American Music in the Twentieth Century. New York: Schirmer Books; London: Prentice Hall International. .
 Herzogenrath, Bernd (ed). 2012. The Farthest Place. The Music of John Luther Adams. Northeastern University Press.
 Morris, Mitchell. 1999. "Ecotopian Sounds, or, The Music of Luther Adams and Strong Environmentalism". Skrifter från Musikvetenskapliga Avdelningen 51. Göteborg: Göteborgs Universitet. .
 Pulitzer Prize.org. 2014. Press release.
 Ross, Alex. 2008. "Letter from Alaska: Song of the Earth: A Composer Takes Inspiration from the Arctic", The New Yorker 84, no. 13 (May 12, 2008): 76–81.
 Young, Gayle. 1998. "Sonic Geography of the Arctic: An Interview with John Luther Adams". Musicworks'', no. 70 (Spring): 38–43.

External links

John Luther Adams's Recordings on Cantaloupe Music
Cold Blue Music: John Luther Adams
Video: John Luther Adams's 'Inuksuit'
NonPop Show 006 – "The Place" interview
, complete performance, Lincoln Center
Interview with John Luther Adams, January 27, 1989

1953 births
20th-century classical composers
21st-century classical composers
American male classical composers
American classical composers
Living people
Musicians from Alaska
People from Fairbanks, Alaska
Musicians from Meridian, Mississippi
Pulitzer Prize for Music winners
Pupils of James Tenney
Oberlin Conservatory of Music faculty
21st-century American composers
20th-century American composers
20th-century American male musicians
21st-century American male musicians